Marco Antonio Peribán Hernández (born 10 August 1984) is a Mexican professional boxer. He is signed with Oscar De La Hoya's Company Golden Boy Promotions.

Personal life
He is the brother of the professional female boxer Guadalupe Peribán, also signed with Golden Boy Promotions.

Amateur career
Peribán with an outstanding amateur career which included wins over American Shawn Porter. He had numerous national championships in Mexico, member of the Mexico national team, and in the 2006 Central American and Caribbean Games won a bronze medal.

Professional career
Peribán won his pro debut against Oscar Solis by third round knock-out. Periban is a very skilled fighter with one of the hardest punches of Mexican Boxing history and one of the few bright spots for Mexican boxing above 160 pounds. Marco achieved international fame after his US and Golden Boy Promotions debut fight over the then 10-0 Roger & Floyd Mayweather´s prospect Dion Savage, Jr. in San Diego, California. The fight lasted just 33 seconds as Peribán knocked Savage out with a fast left-right combination in the first round.

Professional record

|- style="margin:0.5em auto; font-size:95%;"
| style="text-align:center;" colspan="8"|25 Wins (16 knockouts), 5 Losses, 1 Draw
|-  style="text-align:center; margin:0.5em auto; font-size:95%; background:#e3e3e3;"
|  style="border-style:none none solid solid; "|Res.
|  style="border-style:none none solid solid; "|Record
|  style="border-style:none none solid solid; "|Opponent
|  style="border-style:none none solid solid; "|Type
|  style="border-style:none none solid solid; "|Rd., Time
|  style="border-style:none none solid solid; "|Date
|  style="border-style:none none solid solid; "|Location
|  style="border-style:none none solid solid; "|Notes

|- align=center
|Loss
|align=center|26-6-1
|align=left| Padraig McCrory
|
|
|
|align=left|
|align=left|
|- align=center
|Win
|align=center|26-5-1
|align=left| Gabriel Garcia
|
|
|
|align=left|
|
|- align=center
|Loss
|align=center|25-5-1
|align=left| Joshua Buatsi
|
|
|
|align=left|
|align=left|
|- align=center
|Loss
|align=center|25-4-1
|align=left| Avni Yıldırım
|
|
|
|align=left|
|align=left|
|- align=center
|Win
|align=center|25-3-1
|align=left| German Rafael
|
|
|
|align=left|
|align=left|
|- align=center
|Win
|align=center|24-3-1
|align=left| Jose Miguel Torres
|
|
|
|align=left|
|align=left|
|- align=center
|Win
|align=center|23-3-1
|align=left| Joshua Okine
|
|
|
|align=left|
|align=left|
|- align=center
|Win
|align=center|22-3-1||align=left| Carlos Adan Jerez
|
|
|
|align=left|
|align=left|
|- align=center
|Win
|align=center|21-3-1||align=left| Octavio Castro
|
|
|
|align=left|
|align=left|
|- align=center
|Loss
|align=center|20-3-1||align=left| James DeGale
|
|
|
|align=left|
|align=left|
|- align=center
|Loss
|align=center|20-2-1||align=left| J'Leon Love
|
|
|
|align=left|
|align=left|
|- align=center
|Draw || 20-1-1 ||align=left|Badou Jack
| || 10 ||  ||align=left|
|align=left|
|- align=center
|Loss || 20-1 ||align=left|Sakio Bika 
| || 12 ||  ||align=left|
|align=left|
|- align=center
|Win || 20-0 ||align=left|Samuel Miller
| || 2 (10)  ||  ||align=left|
|align=left|
|- align=center
|Win || 19-0 ||align=left|Francisco Sierra 
| || 10 ||  ||align=left|
|align=left|
|- align=center
|Win || 18-0 ||align=left|Lester González
| || 9 (10),  ||  ||align=left|
|align=left|
|- align=center
|Win || 17-0 ||align=left|Gerardo Díaz
| || 2 (10),   ||  ||align=left|
|align=left|
|- align=center
|Win || 16-0 ||align=left|Jesús Ángel Nerio
| || 8 ||  ||align=left|
|align=left|
|- align=center
|Win || 15-0 ||align=left|Dhafir Smith
| ||8 ||  ||align=left|
|align=left|
|- align=center
|Win || 14-0 ||align=left|Alfredo Contreras
| || 8 ||  ||align=left|
|align=left|
|- align=center
|Win || 13-0 ||align=left|José Clavero
| || 2 (10) ||  ||align=left|
|align=left|
|- align=center
|Win || 12-0 ||align=left|Alfredo Mejía
| || 1 (10),   ||  ||align=left|
|align=left|
|- align=center
|Win || 11-0 ||align=left|Dion Savage 
| || 1 (8),  ||  ||align=left|
|align=left|
|- align=center
|Win || 10-0 ||align=left|Darnell Boone 
| || 1 (8),  ||  ||align=left|
|align=left|
|- align=center
|Win || 9-0 ||align=left|Franco Sánchez
| || 5 (8),  ||  ||align=left|
|align=left| 
|- align=center
|Win || 8-0 ||align=left|Jason Naugler
||| 5 (8),  ||  ||align=left|
|align=left|
|- align=center
|Win || 7-0 ||align=left|Salomon Rodríguez
||| 6 ||   ||align=left|
|align=left|
|- align=center
|Win || 6-0 ||align=left|Richard Vidal
||| 6 ||  ||align=left|
|align=left|
|- align=center
|Win || 5-0 ||align=left|Daniel Comaschi 
||| 3 (6) ||  ||align=left|
|align=left|
|- align=center
|Win || 4-0 ||align=left|Hector Macias
||| 2 (4),  ||  ||align=left|
|align=left|
|- align=center
|Win || 3-0 ||align=left|Pedro Esquer
||| 1 (4) ||  ||align=left|
|align=left|
|- align=center
|Win || 2-0 ||align=left|Miguel Zamarripa
||| 4 ||  ||align=left|
|align=left|
|- align=center
|Win || 1-0 ||align=left|Óscar Solis
||| 3 (4),  ||  ||align=left|
|align=left|

References

External links

Olympic boxers of Mexico
Boxers from Mexico City
Light-heavyweight boxers
Super-middleweight boxers
1984 births
Living people
Mexican male boxers